Israel Weapon Industries (IWI), formerly the Magen division of the Israel Military Industries Ltd. (IMI), is an Israeli firearms manufacturer.

It was founded in 1933. Formerly owned by the State of Israel, the Small Arms Division of IMI was privatized and renamed IWI in 2005.

IWI is one of the world's most famous and bestselling military arms manufacturers. 
The Magen division rose to international prominence in the 1950s, as the creator of the Uzi, of which over 10 million would be produced, netting billions of dollars for the company. Subsequent well known military exports have included the Jericho 941 semi-automatic pistol, Negev light machine gun, Galil assault rifle, Tavor assault rifle, and the DAN .338 sniper rifle.

IWI develops and manufactures guns used by armies and law enforcement agencies around the world.

Manufacturing

Ramat HaSharon  
For many decades, IWI and the Magen division of Israeli Military Industries before it, has manufactured its weapons in Ramat HaSharon. The factory has for many years been regarded an important component of the manufacturing sector in Ramat HaSharon. In 2017, IWI announced it is planning to construct a new factory in Kiryat Gat, to which its manufacturing will re-locate when completed in 2020. The new Kiryat Gat factory, whose construction will cost NIS 180 million, will employ 560 full-time production workers and engineers on its assembly lines.

Overseas  
IWI owns several factories overseas, for the manufacture of weapons for local markets. In India, IWI is establishing a joint-manufacturing center with Punj Lloyd (with IWI owning 49% of the plant, and Punj Lloyd owning 51% of the plant), which will be India's first privately-owned small-arms manufacturing plant. The factory will manufacture firearms for the Indian army. IWI said in 2017, that it expects tenders with the Indian army in the region of $200–300 million.

IWI also operates a manufacturing facility in Middletown, Pennsylvania USA. They locally manufacture the Zion Z-15 AR15, Tavor and Galil rifles, TS12 15+1 round semi-automatic shotgun as well as the Zion SBR, Jericho, Masada and Galil pistols, among others.

Products

Security training
IWI offers anti-terrorism training to Israeli citizens and contracts its services to outside countries requiring security training and anti-terror training to protect assets and high-ranking officials.
IWI collaborates with the Metropolitan College of New York (MCNY) in New York City, which offers a classroom-based MA degree in Public Administration, Emergency Management and Homeland Security.

See also
Defense industry of Israel
Military equipment of Israel
List of modern armament manufacturers

References

External links

Firearm manufacturers of Israel
Defense companies of Israel
Israeli brands
1933 establishments in Mandatory Palestine